Roberta Hyson (née Roberta Mae Dudley; 1905–1989) was an American 20th-century actress, dancer, and singer. She appeared in several all African American-cast early talking films by Christie Film Company, and had a leading role in The Melancholy Dame (1929).

Roberta Mae Dudley was born on March 27, 1905, in Dallas, Dallas County, Texas. She died on January 21, 1989, in Los Angeles, Los Angeles County, California.

Filmography
Brown Gravy (1929)
Oft in the Silly Night (1929) as Mezanine Conner
The Melancholy Dame (1929) as Sappho Dill
Music Hath Harms (1929) as Zenia Sprowl
The Framing of the Shrew (1929) as Mallissie Cheese
The Lady Fare (1929) as Miss Eva Mapes
Georgia Rose (1930) as Helen

References

External links 
 

20th-century American actresses
20th-century American dancers
American female dancers
African-American female dancers
African-American actresses
20th-century African-American women
20th-century African-American people
1905 births
1989 deaths